Harry Lind (27 March 1906 – 18 December 1986, Dunfermline) was a Scotland international rugby union player.

Rugby Union career

Amateur career

His club was Dunfermline RFC.

Provincial career

Lind represented the Midlands District.

International career

He was capped 16 times for Scotland between 1928 and 1936 at centre.

In Scotland's Triple Crown win in 1933, when they beat  8-6 by two drop-goals (four points each in those days) to two tries (three points in those days), Lind contributed the winning goal:

"Ireland were pressing on the Scottish line and leading by 6-4 when suddenly the Scottish forwards ignited a foot-rush from their own line to the Irish '25'. Davy was one who had to go in to try and stop the rush and when he got up, there was Harry Lind of Dunfermline slotting the winning drop-goal. 'It was some foot-rush', I remember that great Irishman saying, 'Forwards really could control the dribble in those days."

Referee career

After his playing career, Lind became a rugby union referee.

References

Sources

 Bath, Richard (ed.) The Scotland Rugby Miscellany (Vision Sports Publishing Ltd, 2007 )
 Cotton, Fran (Ed.) (1984) The Book of Rugby Disasters & Bizarre Records. Compiled by Chris Rhys. London. Century Publishing. 
 Godwin, Terry Complete Who's Who of International Rugby (Cassell, 1987)
 Jones, J.R. Encyclopedia of Rugby Union Football (Robert Hale, London, 1976 )
 Massie, Allan A Portrait of Scottish Rugby (Polygon, Edinburgh)

1906 births
1986 deaths
Dunfermline RFC players
Midlands District players
Rugby union players from Dunfermline
Scotland international rugby union players
Scottish Districts referees
Scottish rugby union players
Scottish rugby union referees